Fc receptor-like molecules (FCRLs) are a class of proteins that resemble Fc receptors.  They have been characterized in a number of species, including humans and mice.  They are preferentially expressed by B lymphocytes.  Unlike the classical Fc receptors, there is no strong evidence that suggests that FCRLs bind to the Fc portion of antibodies.  Their function is unknown.

It has been indicated that FCRLs may be a unique marker for immune cells in the brain called microglia, compared to other CNS cells and peripheral immune cells.

Members
 FCRL1
 FCRL2
 FCRL3
 FCRL4
 FCRL5
 FCRL6
 FCRLA. FCRLA associates with IgM, IgG and IgA.
 FCRLB

See also 
 Fc receptor

References

Further reading 

 
 
 
 
 
 

Fc receptors